Bolshevik is a rural locality (a settlement) in Novokhopyorsk, Novokhopyorsky District, Voronezh Oblast, Russia. The population was 171 as of 2010.

Geography 
Bolshevik is located 11 km south of Novokhopyorsk (the district's administrative centre) by road. Kamenka-Sadovka is the nearest rural locality.

References 

Populated places in Novokhopyorsky District